Charles Carson (16 August 1885 – 5 August 1977) was a British actor. A civil engineer before taking to the stage in 1919, his theatre work included directed plays for ENSA during WWII.

Selected filmography

 The Loves of Ariane (1931) – The Professor
 Dreyfus (1931) – Col. Picquart
 Many Waters (1931) – Henry Delauney
 The Chinese Puzzle (1932) – Armand de Rochecorbon
 Monsieur Albert (1932) – Mr. Robertson
 Men of Tomorrow (1932) – Senior Proctor
 Leap Year (1932) – Sir Archibald Mallard
 There Goes the Bride (1932) – M. Marquand (uncredited)
 Marry Me (1932) – Korten
 The Blarney Stone (1933) – Sir Arthur
 The Shadow (1933) – Sir Edward Hulme KC
 The Perfect Flaw (1934) – Henry Kearns
 Trouble in Store (1934, short) – Sanderson
 Whispering Tongues (1934) – Roger Mayland
 The Broken Melody (1934) – Colonel Dubonnet
 No Escape (1934) – Mr. Arnold
 Blossom Time (1934) – Frederick Lafont
 Father and Son (1934) – Colin Bolton
 Blind Justice (1934) – Dr. Naylor
 Hyde Park (1934) – Lord Lenbridge
 Invitation to the Waltz (1935) – Lombardi
 D'Ye Ken John Peel? (1935) – Francis Merrall
 Sanders of the River (1935) – Governor of the Territory
 Abdul the Damned (1935) – Gen. Hilmi-Pasha
 Moscow Nights (1935) – Officer of Defense
 Scrooge (1936) – Middlemark
 Things to Come (1936) – Great Grandfather
 One in a Million (1936) – President
 Forget Me Not (1936) – George Arnold
 Secret Agent (1936) – 'R'
 The Beloved Vagabond (1936) – Charles Rushworth
 Rhythm in the Air (1936) – George, Building Manager
 Head Office (1936) – Armstrong
 Talk of the Devil (1936) – Lord Dymchurch
 Fire Over England (1937) – Adm. Valdez
 Cafe Colette (1937)
 Dark Journey (1937) – Head of Fifth Bureau
 Dreaming Lips (1937) – Impresario
 Secret Lives (1937) – Henri
 Glamorous Night (1937) – Otto
 The Angelus (1937) – John Ware
 Old Mother Riley (1937) – Counsel for Prosecution
 Victoria the Great (1937) – Sir Robert Peel
 Saturday Night Revue (1937) – Mr. Dorland
 Oh Boy! (1938) – Governor
 No Parking (1938) – Hardcastle
 We're Going to Be Rich (1938) – Keeler
 Sixty Glorious Years (1938) – Sir Robert Peel
 The Return of the Frog (1938) – Chief Commissioner
 The Gang's All Here (1939) – Charles Cartwright
 Inspector Hornleigh (1939) – Chief Superintendent (uncredited)
 The Saint in London (1939) – Mr. Morgan
 Inspector Hornleigh on Holiday (1939) – Chief Superintendent (uncredited)
 The Lion Has Wings (1939) – Anti-aircraft Officer
 Spare a Copper (1940) – Admiral
 Quiet Wedding (1941) – Mr. Johnson
 The Common Touch (1941) – Haywood
 Penn of Pennsylvania (1942) – Adm. Penn
 They Flew Alone (1942) – Lord Wakefield
 The Adventures of Tartu (1943) – Arthur Wakefield (uncredited)
 The Dummy Talks (1943) – Marvello
 Battle for Music (1945) – Mr. Wheeler
 Pink String and Sealing Wax (1945) – Editor
 Two Guys from Milwaukee (1946) – Minor Role (uncredited)
 The Lady with a Lamp (1951)
 Cry, the Beloved Country (1951) – James Jarvis
 Moulin Rouge (1952) – Count Moïse de Camondo
 The Master of Ballantrae (1953) – Col. Banks (uncredited)
 Duel in the Jungle (1954) – Skipper
 Beau Brummell (1954) – Sir Geoffrey Baker
 The Dam Busters (1955) – Doctor
 An Alligator Named Daisy (1955) – Wilfred Smethers (uncredited)
 Reach for the Sky (1956) – Air Chief Marshal Sir Hugh Dowding
 The Silken Affair (1956) – Judge
 Let's Be Happy (1957) – Mr. Ferguson, lawyer
 Bobbikins (1959) – Sir Jason Crandall
 A Touch of Larceny (1960) – Robert Holland
 The Trials of Oscar Wilde (1960) – Justice Charles
 Sands of the Desert (1960) – Philpotts
 A Story of David (1961) – Ahimilech
 The Three Lives of Thomasina (1963) – Doctor Strathsea
 Curse of the Fly (1965) – Inspector Charas
 Lady Caroline Lamb (1972) – Potter (final film role)

References

External links

1885 births
1977 deaths
Male actors from London
English male stage actors
English male film actors
English male television actors
20th-century English male actors